Martonyi is a village in Borsod-Abaúj-Zemplén County in northeastern Hungary.

References
Aerial photos of Martonyi

Populated places in Borsod-Abaúj-Zemplén County